Mansukhbhai Raghavjibhai Prajapati is a famous rural innovator in India known for his earthen clay-based functional products like:
 Mitticool
 Non Stick Clay Tawa
 Low cost water filters
He is the holder of the Indian patents for these products, that boast high efficiency and an eco-friendly nature.

He was born in the Prajapati family belonging to the village Nichimandal of Morbi, Rajkot. He had exposure to the clay tradition since his childhood, as this was his family’s traditional profession.
Mitticool was featured recently at a conference organized by the Centre for India & Global Business, Judge Business School, University of Cambridge, UK in May 2009. Bosch and Siemens Hausgeräte (BSH), Germany, one of the world’s largest home appliance companies have also written to GIAN and showed interest in the product. He was born on 17 October 1965. He was born in a poor family where he had to struggle to study.

References

Living people
20th-century Indian inventors
Year of birth missing (living people)